Tehatta Government College (Bengali: তেহট্ট গভর্নমেন্ট কলেজ) is a general degree college nestled on the pleasant banks of Jalangi River at Tehatta in Nadia district of the state of West Bengal, India. The college is affiliated to the University of Kalyani.

Departments

Arts
 Bengali
 English
 History
 Philosophy
 Political science

Science
 Chemistry
 Mathematics
 Physics

Accreditation
The college is recognised by University Grants Commission (UGC).

See also

References

External links
Tehatta govt college
University of Kalyani
University Grants Commission
National Assessment and Accreditation Council

Government colleges in West Bengal
Colleges affiliated to University of Kalyani
Universities and colleges in Nadia district
Educational institutions established in 2014
2014 establishments in West Bengal